Depressaria hirtipalpis is a moth of the family Depressariidae. It is found in Spain, Croatia, North Macedonia and Turkey.

The larvae feed on Salvia officinalis.

References

External links
lepiforum.de

Moths described in 1854
Depressaria
Moths of Europe
Moths of Asia